The People's Revolutionary Army ( - ERP) was one of five leftist guerrilla organizations that comprised the Farabundo Martí National Liberation Front (FMLN). Formed on October 10, 1980, the FMLN  was one of the main participants in the Salvadoran Civil War (1979-1992).

History

The People's Revolutionary Army of El Salvador (ERP) was formed by three different groups in 1970. The first of these groups were social-Christian University Students that took part in a local campaigning for literacy.  They later joined the Social Christian Student Movements (MESC), who were members that branched off from the Democratic Christian parties (PDC). The second group that helped create the ERP were members from the Union of Young Patriots (UJP) and the Salvadoran University Catholic Action (ACUS).  Joaquin Villalobos and Rafael Arce Abalah were activists who came from the ACUS and were integral parts of the formation of the ERP.  The last group that made up the ERP were activists from the Jose Celestino Labor Institute who consisted of members from the Union of Young Patriots (UJP) and the Salvadoran Communist Party (PCS).  These activists focused mostly on teaching young members of the ERP to be future leaders. The ERP focused on armed struggle in order to promote social justice and install a more democratic government. The ERP was officially formed in 1972 by left wing Christian Democrats who wanted to inspire they wanted to inspire the common people to revolt against the government and to have complete control over the government. The ERP's area of operation was located in the regions of Santa Ana, La Guacamaya, and Progresso (Bindford). The ERP focused on Che's foquismo; this meant that the most intellectual people of the working class formed together to recruit other members of the working class.  The ERP wanted to be the center of the El Salvadoran revolution while gaining support from the discontented of and to cause a violent uprising or insurrection by performing military attacks. The Campesinos were one of the ERP's main support groups, along with the Catholic Church.  The close relationship between the ERP and the church is evident in the ERP's symbology. On May 10, 1975 some members of the ERP gathered together and murdered Roque Dalton, an ERP analyst and poet.  Dalton's first choice was to be a foot soldier but was rejected as members thought his role during the revolution was to be a poet.  Many members of the ERP including Villalobos became fearful of Dalton's true intentions while members of the ERP in 1975 fought amongst one another for power. This fight for power led members of the ERP to betray their own in fear of being spied on by members such as Dalton.  Dalton was a main target from beginning interrogated by the CIA while held in prison in Cuba before joining the ERP. The murder of Dalton caused a rift in ERP as members began to leave to join either the National Resistance(RN) or the Armed Forces of National Resistance (FARN). Later in 1982, the ERP joined as one of the four parties that comprised the FMLN. The four groups within the FMLN consisted of the Popular Liberation Forces  (FPL), the National Resistance  (RN), the Revolutionary Party of Central America Workers (PRTC) and the ERP. The importance of joining the FMLN was to be united with other groups that shared similar ideas of overthrowing  the local government.

Leaders
Joaquin Villalobos.  ERP's main leader and founder was Joaquin Villalobos who came originally from the ACUS. Villalobos's role in the ERP mainly being a military strategists and by playing a crucial role in negotiations during the end the civil war.

Rafael Arce Zablah (Alvarez). Zablah.   Zablah was another leader and key activist of ERP that gathered support from local Catholic priests . These communities became an important part of the war by serving as a base for the ERP.

Sebastian Urquilla. Urquilla was founder and leader of the ERP who founded the group named "El Grupo".   This is significant because as El grupo was disbanded in 1970, members helped form.

Edgar Alejandro Rivas Mira. Mira was involved in the murder of  Roque Dalton and Roberto Poma.

Claimed Attacks
According to the Global Terrorism Database, there have been 65 claimed attacks by the ERP. One of these attacks was a kidnapping in 1977 that included ERP member "Edgar Alejandro Rivas Mira," who kidnapped Roberto Poma and killed his body guards. Poma was a wealthy businessman and President of the Salvadoran Institute of Tourism.  The ERP kidnapped him for political and economic reasons as well as to trade him for captured members of the ERP, including commander Ana Guadalupe Martinez. Poma later died from wounds inflicted by the ERP after his release. (IACHR). Another attack by the ERP was the killing of Herbert Ernesto Anaya Sanabria, a leader of the Salvadoran Human Rights Commission.  An ERP member, "Jorge Alberto Miranda Arevalo," denied the killing during his trial in 1988 at the First Criminal court of San Salvador. He was later found guilty of murder and acts of terrorism in October 1991 by a jury of five people. (UN Security...)

References

Further reading
Alvarez, ALberto M. "From Revolutionary War to Democratic Revolution: The Farabundo Marti National Liberation Front (FMLN) in El Salvador." Berghof Transitions Series Resistance/Liberation Movements and Transition to Politics (2010): 12–14. Web.

Armstrong, Robert, and Janet Shenk. El Salvador: The Face of Revolution. London: Pluto, 1982. Print.

Binford, Leigh (2004): "Peasants, Catechists, Revolutionaries: Organic Intellectuals in the Salvadorian Revolution, 1980–1992, in Lauria Santiago, A. D. and L. Binford (eds.), Landscapes of Struggle. Politics, Society and Community in El Salvador, Pittsburgh, University of Pittsburgh Press, pp. 105–125.

IACHR, Report on Human Rights in El Salvador (1978); Ana Guadalupe Martinez, LAS Carceles Clandestinas de El Salvador San Salvador; UCA Editores, 1992.

Lindo-Fuentes, HÃ©ctor, Erik Kristofer Ching, and Lara MartÃnez Rafael A. Remembering a Massacre in El Salvador: The Insurrection of 1932, Roque Dalton, and the Politics of Historical Memory. Albuquerque, NM: U of New Mexico, 2007. Print

UN Security Council, Annex, From Madness to Hope: the 12-year war in El Salvador: Report of the Commission on the Truth for El Salvador, S/25500, 1993, 148–151.

Wood, Elisabeth Jean. Forging Democracy from Below: Insurgent Transitions in South Africa and El Salvador. New York: Cambridge University Press, 2000.

Paramilitary organizations based in El Salvador
Salvadoran Civil War
Guerrilla movements in Latin America
Left-wing militant groups
Farabundo Martí National Liberation Front